Animal costume may refer to:

 Costumed character, mascot costumes that are often based on various animals
 Creature suit, realistic animal costumes often used for film and theater
 Fursuit, usually anthropomorphic animal costumes owned by some members of the furry fandom
 Ritual masks of many indigenous peoples that are shaped like animals